Cai Zongze (born 1951) is a Chinese politician. He has served as Mayor of Shantou, Guangdong province since 2007.

References

People's Republic of China politicians from Guangdong
Politicians from Shantou
Living people
Mayors of places in China
Political office-holders in Guangdong
Chinese Communist Party politicians from Guangdong
1951 births